Maragle is a rural locality in the southeast part of the Riverina, situated approximately  west of Cabramurra as the crow flies, or  by road. The nearest towns are Tumbarumba  to the northwest, and Batlow  to the north.

Geography

State forest (chiefly Eucalyptus delegatensis and pinus radiata) as well as semi-cleared, undulating grazing land characterise the area.

Climate

Owing to its windward position astride the South West Slopes, the region receives a high amount of winter precipitation; of which a large quantity falls as heavy snow at higher elevations. Summers are warm and relatively dry, although springs are characterised by frequent and severe thunderstorms.

References

Towns in the Riverina
Snowy Valleys Council